George Francis Berg (December 2, 1868 - November 27, 1945) was an American soldier serving in the United States Army during the Spanish–American War who received the Medal of Honor for bravery.

Biography
Berg was born December 2, 1868, in Mount Erie, Illinois. After entering the army, he was sent to fight with Company C, 17th U.S. Infantry in the Spanish–American War.

He died November 27, 1945, and is buried in Mount Pleasant Cemetery South Portland, Maine.

Medal of Honor citation
Rank and organization: Private, Company C, 17th U.S. Infantry. Place and date: At El Caney, Cuba, 1 July 1898. Entered service at: __. Birth: Wayne County, Ill. Date of issue: Unknown.

Citation:

Gallantly assisted in the rescue of the wounded from in front of the lines and while under heavy fire of the enemy.

See also

List of Medal of Honor recipients for the Spanish–American War

References

External links

1868 births
1945 deaths
United States Army Medal of Honor recipients
United States Army soldiers
American military personnel of the Spanish–American War
People from Wayne County, Illinois
Spanish–American War recipients of the Medal of Honor
People from South Portland, Maine